Marwan Fares (born 1947 in Qaa) is a Lebanese politician.

Doctorate in French literature from Sorbonne University and professor at the Lebanese University.

He was elected for the Greek-Catholic seat in Baalbek-Hermel since 1996. He chaired between 1996 and 2005 the Parliamentary Committee on Human Rights.

See also
Greater Syria
Politics of Lebanon

References

1947 births
Living people
Lebanese Melkite Greek Catholics
Lebanese University alumni
Members of the Parliament of Lebanon
Syrian Social Nationalist Party in Lebanon politicians